Hudiksvalls FF is a Swedish football club located in Hudiksvall. The club was known as Hudiksvalls ABK, but changed their name, badge and colors in 2011.

Background
Since their foundation in 1931 Hudiksvalls FF has participated mainly in the middle divisions of the Swedish football league system.  The club plays in Division 2 Norrland which is the fourth tier of Swedish football. They play their home matches at the arena Glysisvallen in Hudiksvall.

Hudiksvalls FF are affiliated to the Hälsinglands Fotbollförbund.

Season to season

External links
  – Official Club Website

Footnotes

Football clubs in Gävleborg County
Association football clubs established in 1931
1931 establishments in Sweden